Vladislav Vitalevich Yeryomenko (born April 24, 1999) is a Belarusian professional ice hockey defenceman currently playing for Metallurg Magnitogorsk of the Kontinental Hockey League (KHL).

Playing career
Yeryomenko spent two seasons in North America playing major junior hockey for the Calgary Hitmen of the Western Hockey League (WHL). He was drafted 151st overall by the Nashville Predators in the 2018 NHL Entry Draft. He attended the Predators prospect and training camp but was cut from the team in September 2018 and did not sign a contract with the team, he returned for a third and final junior season with the Hitmen.

He signed his first professional contract in his native Belarus, agreeing to a deal with HC Dinamo Minsk of the Kontinental Hockey League on 19 August 2019.

Following three seasons within Dinamo Minsk, Yeryomenko left the club as a free agent and signed a two-year contract with Russian based club, Metallurg Magnitogorsk on 17 May 2022.

Career statistics

Regular season and playoffs

International

References

External links

1999 births
Living people
Belarusian ice hockey defencemen
Calgary Hitmen players
HC Dinamo Minsk players
Metallurg Magnitogorsk players
Nashville Predators draft picks
Sportspeople from Vitebsk
Yunost Minsk players